Henry Otto Pollak (born December 13, 1927) is an Austrian-American mathematician. He is known for his contributions to information theory, and with Ronald Graham is the namesake of the Graham–Pollak theorem in graph theory.

Born in Vienna, Austria, he since moved to United States.  He received his B.Sc. in Mathematics (1947) from Yale University. While at Yale, he participated in the William Lowell Putnam Mathematical Competition and was on the team representing Yale University (along with Murray Gell-Mann and Murray Gerstenhaber) that won the second prize in 1947. He earned an M.A. and Ph.D. (1951) degree in mathematics from Harvard University, the latter on the thesis Some Estimates for Extremal Distance advised by Lars Ahlfors.

Pollak then joined Bell Labs (1951), where he in the early 1960s became director of the Mathematics and Statistics Research Center. He authored near forty papers, many of these with David Slepian and Henry Landau on analysis, function theory, probability theory, and mathematics education. He has applied mathematics to  solve problems in  physics and networks, communication theory, discrete systems, statistics and data analysis, and economic analysis. Pollak also holds patents in the area of signaling. He has held teaching positions in the mathematics department at Columbia University.

Awards
Earle Raymond Hedrick lecturer (1973)
Mathematical Association of America chair of New Jersey section (1958–59), governor (1961–63) and president (1975–76).
honorary Sc.D. at Bowdoin College (1977)
honorary doctorate from Technische Universiteit Eindhoven (1981)
Dan Christie lecture on On the Addressing Problem in Loop Switching, or, How to Embed an Arbitrary  Graph in a Squashed Cube at Bowdoin College (1983)
Mathematical Association of America Meritorious Service Award (1990)
National Council of Teachers of Mathematics Lifetime Achievement Award (2010)
Mathematical Association of America Mary P. Dolciani Award in 2020.

References

External links

1927 births
Living people
20th-century American mathematicians
21st-century American mathematicians
American information theorists
American statisticians
Austrian emigrants to the United States
Austrian information theorists
Austrian mathematicians
Austrian statisticians
Columbia University faculty
Harvard University alumni
Presidents of the Mathematical Association of America
Scientists at Bell Labs
Scientists from Vienna
Yale University alumni